The Europe/Africa Zone was one of three zones of regional competition in the 1997 Fed Cup.

Group I
Venue: Bari T.C., Bari, Italy (outdoor clay)
Date: 22–26 April

The fifteen teams were divided into three pools of four and one pool of three teams. The top teams of each pool play-off in a two-round knockout stage to decide which nation progresses to World Group II play-offs. The two nations winning the least rubbers were relegated to Europe/Africa Zone Group II for 1998.

Pools

Knockout stage

  and  advanced to World Group II Play-offs.
  and  relegated to Group II in 1998.

Group II
Venue: Ali Bey Club, Manavgat, Turkey (outdoor clay)
Date: 5–11 May

The twenty-five teams were divided into three pools of six and one pool of seven. The top teams from each pool advanced to Group I for 1998.

Pools

See also
Fed Cup structure

References

 Fed Cup Profile, Russia
 Fed Cup Profile, Greece
 Fed Cup Profile, Italy
 Fed Cup Profile, Sweden
 Fed Cup Profile, Romania
 Fed Cup Profile, Belarus
 Fed Cup Profile, Hungary
 Fed Cup Profile, Poland
 Fed Cup Profile, Slovenia
 Fed Cup Profile, Israel
 Fed Cup Profile, Latvia
 Fed Cup Profile, Great Britain
 Fed Cup Profile, Denmark
 Fed Cup Profile, Estonia
 Fed Cup Profile, Armenia
 Fed Cup Profile, Lithuania
 Fed Cup Profile, Yugoslavia
 Fed Cup Profile, Ireland
 Fed Cup Profile, Tunisia
 Fed Cup Profile, Algeria
 Fed Cup Profile, Cameroon
 Fed Cup Profile, Portugal
 Fed Cup Profile, Turkey
 Fed Cup Profile, Bosnia and Herzegovina
 Fed Cup Profile, Norway
 Fed Cup Profile, San Marino
 Fed Cup Profile, Madagascar
 Fed Cup Profile, Malta
 Fed Cup Profile, Luxembourg
 Fed Cup Profile, Macedonia
 Fed Cup Profile, Liechtenstein
 Fed Cup Profile, Botswana

External links
 Fed Cup website

 
Europe Africa
Sport in Bari
Tennis tournaments in Italy
Sport in Manavgat
Tennis tournaments in Turkey
1997 in Turkish tennis
1997 in Italian tennis